The spouse  of the president of Finland has no official role or title, but they often play a ceremonial role alongside the president of Finland.

The first presidential spouse was Ester Ståhlberg, who married the then-incumbent President K. J. Ståhlberg in 1920.

The current spouse is Jenni Haukio, wife of President Sauli Niinistö, who has held the position since March 1, 2012.

The only man to have been spouse of a president of Finland is Pentti Arajärvi, the partner and husband of President Tarja Halonen, who served from 2000 to 2012. They married in 2000 in Mäntyniemi, during her first term.

Spouses

References

Finland
Lists of Finnish women